Haigh is a civil parish in the Metropolitan Borough of Wigan, Greater Manchester, England.  It contains 30 listed buildings that are recorded in the National Heritage List for England.   Of these, one is listed at Grade II*, the middle grade, and the others are at Grade II, the lowest grade.  The parish contains the village of Haigh, the estate of Haigh Hall, and the surrounding countryside.  The most important building in the parish is Haigh Hall; this and a number of buildings in the estate are listed.  The Leeds and Liverpool Canal runs through the parish, and three bridges associated with it are listed.  The other listed buildings include farmhouses, farm buildings, a set of stocks, houses, workers' cottages, a church and associated structures, a school, and a bridge over a disused railway.


Key

Buildings

References

Citations

Sources

Lists of listed buildings in Greater Manchester
Wigan
Buildings and structures in Wigan